Milly-Molly-Mandy is a set of six children's books written and illustrated by English writer Joyce Lankester Brisley published over the period 1928 to 1967. The books follow a little girl, Milly-Molly-Mandy, who wears a pink-and-white striped dress. The illustrations show Milly-Molly-Mandy growing from about age four through to age eight. Translations have been published in at least nine languages, including Finnish, Polish and Icelandic.

Milly-Molly-Mandy's real name is Millicent Margaret Amanda, but she was given the nickname because of the length of her full name. Her adventures are the everyday events of village life: running errands, going to school, making presents, fishing, picnicking, and so on. She lives in "the nice white cottage with the thatched roof" on the edge of a small village. Her parents, grandparents, aunt and uncle also live in the cottage. Her friends are Billy Blunt, a slightly older boy whose parents run a corn shop and Little-Friend-Susan, who lives in the cottage down the road. Occasionally, the stories include other friends such as Miss Muggin's niece Jilly; Bunchy, a slightly younger girl who first appears in the story 'Milly-Molly-Mandy gets a New Dress, and Jessamine, a wealthy girl whose family often vacations at The House with the Iron Railings.

Origin
The stories were originally published in the Christian Science Monitor, beginning in 1925. They were first published as a collection, Milly-Molly-Mandy Stories, in 1928.

Setting
The stories take place in south east England, and because of the proximity to the sea and the downs, and the chalk roads in the village, they would appear to take place near to the south coast.  There are map illustrations inside the front covers of each book. Each differs slightly to indicate the different events in the stories. When they take a trip to the seaside by train, another illustration has white cliffs which would suggest Kent or Sussex, and is visually rather akin to Eastbourne.  The author was born in Bexhill-on-Sea, East Sussex, which is the next town east of Eastbourne.  Both Bexhill and Eastbourne have railway stations.  Milly-Molly-Mandy's village (possibly based on picturesque Alfriston or similar in East Sussex) does not have a railway station but she goes to a nearby town via pony and trap to take the train, these could be akin to Polegate, Berwick or Glynde which are close to Alfriston (if the author did base the stories on her own nearby area).  The year is the late 1920s, given the state of inventions; cars are just spreading into general use but there are no telephones, household electricity or aeroplanes as a rule.

Characters
Family
Milly-Molly-Mandy.
Milly-Molly-Mandy's real name is Millicent Margaret Amanda but her family thought it too long a name to call every time they wanted her. She always wears a pink and white striped frock and sometimes a yellow hat. Milly-Molly-Mandy helps by running errands for the family. Milly-Molly-Mandy lives in a nice white cottage with a thatched roof with her large family.Father's first name is John. Father does all the gardening and grows vegetables for the whole family to eat and sell.Mother's first name is Mary but she is called Polly in everyday use. Mother makes all the meals for the family and does all the washing.Grandpa takes the vegetables to market using his pony (Twinkletoes) and cart.Grandma knits socks, mittens and nice warm woolies for them all. In Milly-Molly-Mandy Spends A Penny, Grandma teaches her to knit a tea cosy.Uncle's first name is Joe. Uncle keeps cows (to give them all milk) and chickens (to give them all eggs).Aunty sews frocks and shirts for them all and does the sweeping and dusting. Aunty's first name is Alice.Great Aunt Margaret is Grandma's sister and came to stay for a few days.Topsy is Milly-Molly-Mandy's black and white cat.Toby is Milly-Molly-Mandy's small black and white terrier.Duckling: In the story Milly-Molly-Mandy spends a penny she saves up three pennies and buys a duckling.

FriendsLittle Friend Susan (Susan Moggs) is Milly-Molly-Mandy's best friend. She lives with her mother and father and little sister Doris in a cottage near Milly-Molly-Mandy's.Billy Blunt is another friend of Milly-Molly-Mandy's. Milly-Molly-Mandy, Susan, and Billy often go around playing together. Billy Blunt lives with his mother and father who own a corn shop in the village.Jessamine is the little girl whose wealthy family often vacations at The House with the Iron Railings. In one story, she and her mother take MMM, Billy, and Susan on a drive to the Downs.Jilly Muggins is another friend to Milly-Molly-Mandy. She lives with her Aunty, Miss Muggins, who owns a shop that sells sweets and material and other useful things that everybody in the village needs.

Adults in the villageMr Rudge is a blacksmith who Milly-Molly-Mandy invited to their party. He plays cricket. In the last book he gets married and Milly-Molly-Mandy and Little Friend Susan are the bridesmaids.Miss Edwards is a teacher at Milly-Molly-Mandy's school. In one of the stories, Miss Sheppard the headmistress went away and Miss Edwards became the headteacher. She moves into the school cottage. Because she was moving from the town into the cottage, Miss Edwards writes to Milly-Molly-Mandy's mother to ask if she might stay for a few days while she gets the cottage sorted out. Mother agrees to this so Milly-Molly-Mandy is worried that she will have to be on her best behavior. In fact, teacher turns out to be completely a different person away from school; Billy Blunt and Little Friend Susan wish that she had come to their houses.

Other ChildrenDoris Moggs is Little Friend Susan's baby sister. Milly-Molly-Mandy helps look for a name for her and decides on Primrose but Mrs Moggs had already named her Doris. Milly-Molly-Mandy crochets Doris a bonnet when she (MMM) gets locked in her bedroom by accident.Bunchy''''s name is Violet Rosemary May, called  "Bunchy for short" by her Granny who makes her dresses from floral fabric. In the story Milly-Molly-Mandy has a New Dress, Bunchy and Milly-Molly-Mandy engage over buying dress fabric. Though both girls like the floral fabric, Milly-Molly-Mandy decides Bunchy should have it because of her name and the two become friends.

Brisley went on to write two spin-off Bunchy books.

Book series

 Original six books Milly-Molly-Mandy Stories (1928)More of Milly-Molly-Mandy (1929)Further Doings of Milly-Molly-Mandy (1932)Milly-Molly-Mandy Again (1948)Milly-Molly-Mandy & Co (1955)Milly-Molly-Mandy and Billy Blunt (1967)
Many printings of the original Milly-Molly-Mandy books have been made available over the decades by various publishers.

 Stories 
The original six books include 64 stories.
 Milly-Molly-Mandy Stories (1928)
Milly-Molly-Mandy Goes Errands
Milly-Molly-Mandy Spends a Penny
Milly-Molly-Mandy Meets Her Great-Aunt
Milly-Molly-Mandy Goes Blackberrying
Milly-Molly-Mandy Goes to a Party
Milly-Molly-Mandy Enjoys a Visit
Milly-Molly-Mandy Goes Gardening
Milly-Molly-Mandy Makes a Cosy
Milly-Molly-Mandy Keeps Shop
Milly-Molly-Mandy Gives a Party
Milly-Molly-Mandy Goes Visiting
Milly-Molly-Mandy Gets to Know Teacher
Milly-Molly-Mandy Goes to a Fête
 More of Milly-Molly-Mandy (1929)
Milly-Molly-Mandy Gets Up Early
Milly-Molly-Mandy Has a Surprise
Milly-Molly-Mandy Gets Up a Tree
Milly-Molly-Mandy Goes to a Concert
Milly-Molly-Mandy Has her Photo Taken
Milly-Molly-Mandy Goes to the Pictures
Milly-Molly-Mandy Goes for a Picnic
Milly-Molly-Mandy Looks for a Name
Milly-Molly-Mandy Gets Locked In
Milly-Molly-Mandy's Mother Goes Away
Milly-Molly-Mandy Goes to the Sea
Milly-Molly-Mandy Finds a Nest
Milly-Molly-Mandy Has Friends
 Further Doings of Milly-Molly-Mandy (1932)
Milly-Molly-Mandy Has a Tea-Party
Milly-Molly-Mandy Minds a Baby
Milly-Molly-Mandy Goes Motoring
Milly-Molly-Mandy Gets a Surprise
Milly-Molly-Mandy Goes on an Expedition 
Milly-Molly-Mandy Helps to Thatch a Roof
Milly-Molly-Mandy Writes Letters
Milly-Molly-Mandy Learns to Ride
Milly-Molly-Mandy Makes a Garden
Milly-Molly-Mandy Camps Out
Milly-Molly-Mandy Goes Carol-Singing
 Milly-Molly-Mandy Again (1948)
Milly-Molly-Mandy has a New Dress 
Milly-Molly-Mandy finds a Train
Milly-Molly-Mandy and the Surprise Plant
Milly-Molly-Mandy and the Blacksmith's Wedding
Milly-Molly-Mandy and Dum-dum 66
Milly-Molly-Mandy and the Gang 8
Milly-Molly-Mandy goes Sledging
 Milly-Molly-Mandy & Co (1955)
Milly-Molly-Mandy Dresses Up
Milly-Molly-Mandy Goes for a Picnic
Milly-Molly-Mandy Has a Clean Frock
Milly-Molly-Mandy and the Golden Wedding 
Milly-Molly-Mandy Cooks a Dinner
Milly-Molly-Mandy Acts for the Pictures
Milly-Molly-Mandy and Guy Fawkes Day
 Milly-Molly-Mandy and Billy Blunt (1967)
Milly-Molly-Mandy rides a Horse
Milly-Molly-Mandy does an Errand
Milly-Molly-Mandy finds a Parcel
Milly-Molly-Mandy goes Excavating 
Milly-Molly-Mandy has an Adventure 
Milly-Molly-Mandy on Bank Holiday
Milly-Molly-Mandy has American Visitors
Milly-Molly-Mandy and a Wet Day 
Milly-Molly-Mandy makes some Toffee
In subsequent years these stories were released in varying formats by several publishers.

Collections 
Numerous variations of the original Milly-Molly-Mandy books have been published. Most include Joyce Lankester Brisley's original line drawings. These are a few pertinent editions:

Complete collections 
Individual volumes:
 Pan Macmillan U.K publishes the original six books; 2018 formatting.
Omnibus editions:
 The Adventures of Milly-Molly-Mandy, Omnibus, (1972) publisher: George G Harrap & Co, London.  Includes books: #1, #2, #3.
 The Milly-Molly-Mandy, Second Omnibus (1976) publisher: George G Harrap & Co, London. Includes books: #4, #5, #6.

Partial collections 
 75th Anniversary Edition - The Big Milly-Molly-Mandy Storybook (2000); Clara Vulliamy illustrations, cover and throughout; 2 pg introduction by Vulliamy; 11.125 x 8.75 in; 8 stories; Kingfisher Publishers.

Kingfisher Publishers released The Milly-Molly-Mandy Collection (1996), a two volume slipcase set. These books are currently sold separately by Kingfisher-Macmillian:The Milly-Molly-Mandy Storybook (2001) 21 stories from books #1-4More Milly-Molly-Mandy (1999) 20 stories from books #2-6
Puffin Books has published the first four books individually and in one volume. The publications are  limited to the first four books, including those titled as "complete":The Adventures of Milly Molly Mandy, 4 books in 1 (1992) 1 volume 
 The Complete Milly-Molly-Mandy Box Set (2010)
 Milly-Molly-Mandy the Complete Adventures (2012) 4 book set

Alternate titles
More recently, Milly-Molly-Mandy books have also been published under alternate titles, with five or six stories per book.

Gardners Books through Pan Macmillan published a boxed set of four books, The Best of Milly-Molly-Mandy (2004), which was later carried by Kingfisher and released separately the next year. These were billed as in a "dainty, accessible format"  featuring Clara Vulliamy cover art with Brisley interior illustrations:
 
 Milly-Molly-Mandy's Family (2005)
 Milly-Molly-Mandy's Friends (2005)
 Milly-Molly-Mandy's Schooldays (2005) 
 Milly-Molly-Mandy's Adventures (2005) 
MacMillan Children's Books publishes the four above titles along with additional seasonal titles all featuring the Brisley illustrations. These are carried under the series name The World of Milly-Molly-Mandy:

 Milly-Molly-Mandy's Family (2011)
 Milly-Molly-Mandy's Friends (2012)

 Milly-Molly-Mandy's School Days (2012)
 Milly-Molly-Mandy's Adventures (2012) 
 Milly-Molly-Mandy's Spring (2012) 
 Milly-Molly-Mandy's Summer (2012) 
 Milly-Molly-Mandy's Autumn (2012) 
 Milly-Molly-Mandy's Winter (2012)

Spin off - Bunchy books
The character Bunchy is introduced in the story Milly-Molly-Mandy has a New Dress (1948). Her full name name is Violet Rosemary May, and she is called "Bunchy for short" by Granny who makes her dresses from floral fabric.

Joyce Brisley went on to write two books featuring Bunchy. She lives alone with her Granny on the outskirts of the village, and uses her imagination to enjoy adventures such as engaging with characters from a card game, a little snow-globe man and a wooden sailor-doll.

The books are Illustrated with the author's pen and ink drawings. Early printings of both books included a Brisley watercolor frontispiece.

 Bunchy  (1937); George G. Harrap & Co.  London; ISBN 978-1903252222
 Another Bunchy Book (1951); George G. Harrap & Co. London

Adaptations and merchandising

There have been some Milly-Molly-Mandy adaptations and merchandising. Kingfisher released a doll and Pan Macmillan has published an activity book; there is also a niche market for Milly-Molly-Mandy's classic red and white striped dress with white bloomers. 
 Plays: Three Little Milly-Molly-Mandy Plays (1938) adapted from Milly-Molly-Mandy Stories by Joyce Lankester Brisley; George G. Harrap & Co. LTD.
 Children's beginner readers:  Milly-Molly-Mandy Infant Reader (1936-1939) by Joyce Lankester Brisely, adapted by Margaret McCrea; Four book series; George G. Harrap publishing. In the 1950s these illustrated books were reprinted by The Australasian Publishing Company, in Australia.
 Vinyl record: The Adventures of Milly-Molly-Mandy (1982); six stories narrated by Janie Rayne; UK Press LP; Copyright © The Trustees of The J.L.Brisley Charitable Trust

Illustrations
Joyce Lankester Brisley illustrated her stories with pen and ink line drawings which continue to be featured in current editions. Color frontispieces with Brisley's watercolors were featured in the six original books published by George G. Harrap & Co. Brisley's original artwork is heId at the V&A Archive of Art and Design.

In 2000, Clara Vulliamy illustrations were featured throughout the 75th anniversary edition, The Big Milly-Molly-Mandy Storybook, released by Kingfisher-Macmillian. The Vulliamy watercolors were also used as cover art for both Kingfisher's Milly-Molly-Mandy Stories (2001) and The Best of Milly-Molly-Mandy 2005 series, with Brisley's original pen and ink drawings within these books.

Reception
While acknowledging that the stories have been sometimes represented as twee and sentimental, Lucy Mangan, writing in The Guardian, describes them as delightful and comforting: "each story is a miniature masterpiece, as clear, warm and precise as the illustrations by the author that accompanied them".

In a review for Girl Museum'', Rebecca Taylor noted the "pure innocence of the tales" depicting an idealized rural England illustrated "how country life for girls was very different from city life." She also described Milly-Molly-Mandy character as "kind, strong, adventurous and brave" justifying her positive generational appeal.

External links
 Internet Archive: Milly-Molly-Mandy
 Joyce Lankester Brisley papers held at V&A Museum
 McMillan publishers: Joyce Lankester Brisley
 Pan McMillan publishers: Joyce Lankester Brisley
 Penguin UK: Joyce Lankester Brisley

References

Children's short story collections
Series of children's books
Child characters in literature
Characters in children's literature
British children's books